Todd Stepsis is an American football coach. He is the head football coach at Drake University, a position he has held since the 2019 season.

Coaching career
Following his career at Ashland University, Stepsis began his coaching career at Otterbein University in 1999. He then spent eight seasons at Capital University and six seasons as defensive coordinator at Saginaw Valley State University. He joined the staff at Drake in the same position for the 2014 season. Following five seasons in this role, Stepsis was promoted to head coach following the resignation of Rick Fox following the 2018 season. He was previously the defensive coordinator.

Personal life
A Shelby, Ohio native, Stepsis was a member of the football team and graduated from Ashland University. He majored in special education, and also got a master's degree in sports education in 1999. He and his wife, Angie, have two daughters, Addison and Avery. He is also father to a son, Zander, and daughter, Zoe.

Head coaching record

References

External links
 Drake profile

Year of birth missing (living people)
Living people
Capital Comets football coaches
Drake Bulldogs football coaches
Otterbein Cardinals football coaches
Saginaw Valley State Cardinals football coaches